The Mizoram cricket team is a cricket team that represents the state of Mizoram in Indian domestic competitions. In July 2018, the Board of Control for Cricket in India (BCCI) named the team as one of the nine new sides that would compete in domestic tournaments for the 2018–19 season, including the Ranji Trophy and the Vijay Hazare Trophy. However, the Telangana Cricket Association questioned the decision to include the team in the Ranji Trophy, stating that there should be qualification criteria to allow a team to compete.

In September 2018, they lost their opening fixture of the 2018–19 Vijay Hazare Trophy, to Arunachal Pradesh, by 4 wickets. In their first season in the Vijay Hazare Trophy, they finished in eighth place in the Plate Group, with one win and six defeats from their eight matches. One match also finished as a no result. Taruwar Kohli finished as the leading run-scorer, with 373 runs, and the leading wicket-taker for the team, with eight dismissals.

In November 2018, in their opening match of the 2018–19 Ranji Trophy, they lost to Nagaland by an innings and 333 runs. It was the biggest defeat for a team making its debut in the Ranji Trophy. They finished the 2018–19 tournament in ninth and last place in the table, with no wins from their eight matches.

In March 2019, Mizoram finished in last place in Group D of the 2018–19 Syed Mushtaq Ali Trophy, with no wins from their seven matches. Taruwar Kohli was the leading run-scorer for the team in the tournament, with 222 runs, and Sinan Khadir was the leading wicket-taker, with seven dismissals.

Squad

Updated as on 17 January 2023

References

Indian first-class cricket teams
Cricket in Mizoram
2018 establishments in Mizoram
Cricket clubs established in 2018